The spy gondola, spy basket, observation car or sub-cloud car ( or ) is a crewed vessel that an airship hiding in cloud cover could lower several hundred metres to a point below the clouds in order to inconspicuously observe the ground and help navigate the airship. It was a byproduct of Peilgondel development (a gondola to weight an airship's radio-locating antenna). They were used almost exclusively by the Germans in the First World War on their military airships.

Development
The Peilgondel was developed by Paul Jaray to act as a heavy plumbbob for an airship's radio antenna. A free-hanging antenna wire would move and flex in the wind hindering communications; the added weight reduced this movement. Jaray then developed the Peilgondel further into a crewed spy gondola.

Use 
Spy baskets were used on, among others, Schütte-Lanz and Zeppelin airships. , it was not always certain which airships used them: the blueprints for LZ 62 (L 30) and LZ 72 (L 31) included the spy basket operating plant but the German Navy was no longer installing them at that time; however a fish-shaped spy basket can be seen on photographs of the German Army LZ 83 (tactical number LZ 113).

Zeppelin spy basket development and use 
Captain Ernst A. Lehmann, the German airship captain, described in his book The Zeppelins how he and Baron Gemmingen, Count Zeppelin's nephew, had developed the device. To test the prototype he blindfolded the helmsman of the airship and allowed himself to be lowered by a winch from the bombroom in a modified cask, equipped with a telephone. He later recounted how, while returning from the aborted raid on London in March 1916 in the Z 12, Baron Gemmingen insisted on being the first to use it on their secondary target, Calais. The basket was equipped with a wicker chair, chart table, electric lamp, compass, telephone, and lightning conductor. With the Zeppelin sometimes within, sometimes above the clouds and unable to see the ground, Gemmingen in the hanging basket would relay orders on navigation and when and which bombs to drop. The Calais defenders could hear the engines but their searchlights and artillery fire did not reach the airship.

The tether was high grade steel with a brass core insulated with rubber to act as the telephone cable.

Despite Gemmingen reporting a feeling of loneliness while being lowered and losing sight of the airship, crewmen would nevertheless volunteer for this duty because it was the one place they could smoke.

Surviving examples

The Imperial War Museum in London exhibits a Zeppelin observation car that was found near Colchester after the Zeppelin air raid on the night of the September 2–3, 1916. It is believed to have been carried by the LZ 90 and was being deployed uncrewed when the winch accidentally ran out of control. It was found along with 1500 metres of cable. The winch was jettisoned near Bury St. Edmunds.

In fiction
The spy basket's use is dramatized in the 1930 film Hell's Angels and in the long-running British comic Charley's War (1979-1986). In both stories, ruthless German airship commanders order the jettisoning of their ship's cloud car (with the observer still in it) to save weight when their airships come under attack.

Notes

References 

Lehmann, Ernst A.; Mingos, Howard.  archived from Zeppelin3. The Zeppelins. Chapter III REASONS FOR THE LONDON RAIDS

External links
 
 

Aircraft components
Airship technology
Aviation history of Germany
Espionage devices
Navigational equipment
Imperial German Army Air Service